The 2017–2019 Philippine jeepney drivers' strike is a series of protest and strike action staged by jeepney drivers in the Philippines to oppose the government's plan to phaseout jeepneys over 15 years old. The strike, which started on February 6, caused hundreds of passengers to be stranded and prompted universities, cities, and towns to suspend classes. Part of the protest is to forward an alternative on modernization based upon national industrialization and not corporate takeover.

Protests

2017

February 6

Suspension of classes 
Afternoon classes in the cities of Manila, Malabon, and Pasay were suspended. Classes in Adamson University, Colegio de San Juan de Letran, De La Salle University, Far Eastern University, National University, University of the Philippines Manila, and University of Santo Tomas were also suspended.

February 27

Suspension of classes 
On the evening of February 26, Malacañang Palace, through the Office of the Executive Secretary, suspended the classes for elementary and secondary levels in Metro Manila. Several universities, cities and towns—such as Makati, Iloilo City, Talisay, Cebu, Mandaue, Navotas, Pateros, Cainta, Parañaque, Taytay, Valenzuela, Bacolod, and Antipolo—have suspended classes.

October 16–17 
On October 15, 2017, Malacañang announced that classes and government work were suspended throughout the Philippines on the second day of strike, October 17, 2017, due to the third strike. 
The Metropolitan Manila Development Authority (MMDA) suspended the enforcement of the Unified Vehicular Volume Reduction Program (UVVRP), known as the number coding scheme on October 17, 2017, the second day of the strike.
The Department of Foreign Affairs (DFA) announced that its consular offices closed on the first day of strike, October 16, 2017.

2018

March 19
On March 19, 2018, PISTON held the fourth protest against the jeepney modernization.

Suspension of classes
Malacañang announced that classes suspended throughout Metro Manila on March 19, 2018, due to the strike.

June 25
On June 25, 2018, Piston held the fifth protest against the jeepney modernization.

Suspension of classes
Albay Governor Al Francis Bichara announced on June 22 that classes suspended in some portions of Albay due to the strike on June 25.

2019

September 30
On September 30, 2019, Piston held the sixth protest against the jeepney modernization.

Suspension of classes
Classes are suspended in several areas in the Philippines due to the strike.

See also
2023 transport strike in the Philippines

References

Transportation in the Philippines
Protests in the Philippines
2017 in the Philippines
2018 in the Philippines
2019 in the Philippines
Presidency of Rodrigo Duterte
Labor disputes in the Philippines
2017 labor disputes and strikes
2018 labor disputes and strikes
2019 labor disputes and strikes